The Sunbeam Dyak was a British inline six-cylinder, water-cooled, twin updraft carburettor engine.

It had an aluminium sump, block and cylinder head, and is an overhead camshaft design with two valves per cylinder. The output was approximately 106 horsepower (79 kW). The engine was started by turning a geared crank handle in the cockpit. The diesel-powered Sunbeam Pathan was developed from this engine.

The first Queensland and Northern Territory Aerial Services (QANTAS) aircraft in Australia (an Avro 504K) was fitted with a Sunbeam Dyak engine by the Australian Aircraft & Engineering Co. Ltd. in Mascot, New South Wales.

Specifications (Dyak)

See also

References

Notes

Bibliography

 Lumsden, Alec. British Piston Engines and their Aircraft. Marlborough, Wiltshire: Airlife Publishing, 2003. .

External links

 

Dyak
1910s aircraft piston engines